Fuller is an unincorporated community in Jefferson County, in the U.S. state of Pennsylvania.

History
A post office was established at Fuller in 1875, and remained in operation until 1915. Abel Fuller was the first postmaster.

References

Unincorporated communities in Jefferson County, Pennsylvania
Unincorporated communities in Pennsylvania